Captain Beaky & His Band (Not Forgetting Hissing Sid!!!), commonly shortened to Captain Beaky & His Band or Captain Beaky, is the title of two albums (volumes 1 and 2) of poetry by Jeremy Lloyd set to music by Jim Parker and recited by various British celebrities. The albums generated two books of poetry, BBC television shows, a West End musical, a pantomime (Captain Beaky and His Musical Christmas performed by Twiggy, Eleanor Bron, Keith Michell and Jeremy Lloyd at the Apollo Victoria Theatre, London, in December 1981), performances by the National Youth Ballet of Great Britain and a gala in aid of UNICEF performed by Roger Moore, Joanna Lumley, Jeremy Lloyd and the National Youth Ballet at the Royal Albert Hall, London, in December 2011. The first album was released on vinyl in 1977 and the second in 1980. Both were re-released on compact disc in 2002.

Captain Beaky's band consist of Timid Toad, Reckless Rat, Artful Owl and Batty Bat. The title track from the first album, "Captain Beaky", was released as a 7 inch single with "Wilfred the Weasel" and "Blanche" on the B-side by Polydor in 1980; it reached Number 5 in the UK Singles Chart and number 36 in Australia. The song, sung by Keith Michell, informs us that:

According to Jonathan Rowlands, the producer of both albums, when BBC Radio 1 disc jockey Noel Edmonds heard colleague Tony Blackburn play the record, "he grabbed it from his turntable, played it just once, and the result was that an atomic scientist who was on secondment with the British Museum, upon hearing the show and recognising that Captain Beaky's bete-noir  Hissing Sid was not all that bad, wrote in [to the BBC] proclaiming "Hissing Sid Is Innocent Okay!".

The character of Hissing Sid is a snake, mentioned in both "Captain Beaky" on the first album and "The Trial of Hissing Sid" on the second. The slogan "Hissing Sid is Innocent!" became a popular catch phrase, appearing everywhere including as a graffito on walls (sometimes as a modification for earlier "George Davis is Innocent!" graffiti, especially after Davis' second conviction), on badges, and on car stickers.

Track listings

Volume I 
First released on vinyl in 1977.  Re-released as a compact disc (EAN 5032796014621) in 2002.
 "Captain Beaky", Keith Michell
 "Harold the Frog", Harry Secombe
 "Jacques, a Penniless French Mouse", Peter Sellers
 "Nathaniel Gnat", Twiggy
 "Wilfred the Weasel", Keith Michell
 "Dilys the Dachshund", Harry Secombe
 "The Snail", Twiggy
 "Blanche", Keith Michell
 "My Best Friend", Jeremy Lloyd
 "The Ginger Cat", Keith Michell
 "Desmond the Duck", Harry Secombe
 "Ronald the Rat", Twiggy
 "The Haggis Season", Peter Sellers
 "Dennis the Dormouse", Twiggy
 "Herbert the Hedgehog", Harry Secombe
 "Doreen the Duckling", The King's Singers (CD edition only)
 Overture "The Orchestra"

Volume II 
First released on vinyl in 1980.  Re-released as a compact disc (EAN 5032796014720) in 2002.
 "The Trial of Hissing Sid!!!", Keith Michell
 "Jock the Flea", Jeremy Lloyd
 "Candle Tango", Keith Michell
 "Fred and Marguerite", Petula Clark
 "Helen the Hippo", Penelope Keith
 "Mandy the Mouse", Noel Edmonds
 "Fanshaw the Fly", Keith Michell
 "Stanley the Stork", Peter Skellern
 "Kenny the Koala", Harry Secombe
 "Daddy Long Legs", Peter Skellern (with footnotes by Lionel Blair)
 "Browser Long", Penelope Keith
 "Enrico the Canary", Harry Secombe (accompanied by Midori Nishiura)
 "Teddy's Tea Time", Jeremy Lloyd
 "Wendell the Worm", The King's Singers
 "The Bumble Bee", Petula Clark
 "Dotty the Cuckoo", Noel Edmonds
 "Camille", Matthew Vine
 "Captain Beaky's Christmas Pantomime", Keith Michell
 "Captain Beaky's Christmas Carol", Matthew Vine

The original vinyl and cassette editions differ slightly from this track listing, omitting some tracks but including the additional "Doreen the Duckling", The King's Singers and with "Teddy's Tea Time" titled "Nearly Four".

Captain Beaky and His Band
Most of Volume I and Volume II, slightly re-ordered, issued as a cassette by Polydor.
 "Captain Beaky", Keith Michell
 "Harold the Frog", Harry Secombe
 "Jacques, a Penniless French Mouse", Peter Sellers
 "Desmond the Duck", Harry Secombe
 "Wilfred the Weasel", Keith Michell
 "Dilys the Dachshund", Harry Secombe
 "The Snail", Twiggy
 "Blanche", Keith Michell
 "My Best Friend", Jeremy Lloyd
 "The Ginger Cat", Keith Michell
 "Nathaniel Gnat", Twiggy
 "Ronald the Rat", Twiggy
 "The Haggis Season", Peter Sellers
 "Dennis the Dormouse", Twiggy
 "Herbert the Hedgehog", Harry Secombe
 Overture "The Orchestra"
 "Jock the Flea", Jeremy Lloyd
 "Candle Tango", Keith Michell
 "Fred and Marguerite", Petula Clark
 "Doreen the Duckling", The King's Singers
 "Helen the Hippo", Penelope Keith
 "The Trial of Hissing Sid!!!", Keith Michell
 "Mandy the Mouse", Noel Edmonds
 "Fanshaw the Fly", Keith Michell
 "Kenny the Koala", Harry Secombe
 "Daddy Long Legs", Peter Skellern (with footnotes by Lionel Blair)
 "Browser Long", Penelope Keith
 "Enrico the Canary", Harry Secombe (accompanied by Midori Nishiura)
 "Teddy's Tea Time", Jeremy Lloyd
 "Wendell the Worm", The King's Singers
 "The Bumble Bee", Petula Clark
 "Dotty the Cuckoo", Noel Edmonds
 "Camille", Matthew Vine
 "Captain Beaky's Christmas Pantomime", Keith Michell

Books 
 
 
 
 
  a collection of 28 poems illustrated by Keith Michell
  a retelling of parts of the story of Jesus set in a woodland

References

External links
 archived Captain Beaky official web site

Comedy albums by British artists
1977 albums
1980 albums